Cipollino, or Little Onion as translated from the original, is a fictional character from Gianni Rodari's eponymous Tale of Cipollino, also known under its 1957 renamed title Adventures of Cipollino, a children's tale about political oppression. He also appeared before the publication of the book in the children's magazine Il Pioniere of which Rodari was the editor. Cipollino was popular in the Soviet Union, up to the point of being adapted as a ballet composed by Karen Khachaturian and choreographed by Henrich Mayorov, originally staged in Taras Shevchenko National Opera and Ballet Theatre of Ukraine on November 8 1974.

In a world inhabited by anthropomorphic produce, Cipollino fights the unjust treatment of his fellow vegetable townsfolk by the fruit royalty (Prince Lemon and the overly proud Lord Tomato) in the garden kingdom. The main theme is the struggle of the underclass against the powerful, good versus evil, and the importance of friendship in the face of difficulties.

Adaptations 
Chipollinos tavgadasavali (Adventure of Cippolino), a Georgian TV film
Cipollino, a 1961 Soyuzmultfilm film directed by Boris Dyozhkin, and then re-released in 1993 by Film Roman. The English version features characters played by Canadian voice actors.
Cipollino, Soviet film directed by Tamara Lisitsian

Voices

Russian 

 Margarita Kupriyanova as Cipollino
 Sergey Martinson as Prince Lemon and Lemon's guards
 Vladimir Lepko as one of Lemon's guards
 Grigory Shpigel as Lord Tomato
 Aleksey Polevoy as Godfather Pumpkin
 Vera Orlova as Radish
 Margarita Korabelnikova as Count Cherry
 Yelena Ponsova as Countesses Cherries
 Georgy Millyar as Mister Carrot and Uncle Blueberry
 Erast Garin as Uncle Grape
 Georgy Vitsin as Cactus
 Yuri Khrzhanovsky as Dog Pylesosik (lit. vacuum cleaner)

English
 Kathleen Barr
 Lynda Boyd
 Paul Dobson
 Doc Harris
 David Kaye
 Terry Klassen
 Campbell Lane
 Scott McNeil
 Cathy Weseluck
 Dale Wilson

See also

Gianni Rodari's works

References

External links
 
Chipollino ballet

Child characters in literature
Fruit and vegetable characters
Italian literature